Wise Guys Prefer Brunettes is a silent short subject directed by F. Richard Jones and Stan Laurel, starring James Finlayson, Ted Healy, Charlotte Mineau and Helene Chadwick. It was released by Pathé Exchange on October 3, 1926.

Plot
Helene Chadwick plays a like-named coed at Pinkham University who runs a shop selling sexy gowns. The dean (James Finlayson) believes that Helene's shop is behind the recent breakdown of campus discipline and wants her expelled. Meanwhile, Ted Healy—portraying Napoleon Fizz, PU’s "11-year freshman"—has been developing a rejuvenating plaster. He and Helene conspire to test it on the dean. It works, transforming Finlayson into the campus Romeo. Helene and Napoleon promptly usher him into a compromising situation at a girls' sorority house, and he's emerging from the plaster's effects just as the university's president (Burr McIntosh) shows up.

Cast
James Finlayson (as Jimmie Finlayson) – Stan Pincher
Ted Healy – Napoleon Fizz
Charlotte Mineau – The Matron
Helene Chadwick – Helene (uncredited)
Burr McIntosh – The President (uncredited)
Tyler Brooke – Faculty member (uncredited)
Sammy Brooks – Undetermined secondary role (uncredited)
Clarence Courtright – Faculty member (uncredited)
Helen Gilmore – Undetermined secondary role (uncredited)
Clara Guiol – Co-ed (uncredited)
Martha Sleeper – Waitress (uncredited)

Production notes
The film's title, clearly a play on the 1925 comic novel, Gentlemen Prefer Blondes, by Anita Loos, was the brainchild of H. M. Walker, as were all of the film's title cards. Perhaps returning the favor, Loos dubbed her novel's sequel, published in December 1927, But Gentlemen Marry Brunettes.

Vaudevillian Ted Healy made his screen debut here, as well as his only pre-talkie appearance. As for Stan Laurel, this may have been his final credited directorial assignment; shortly after the film's release, he was starting to be paired onscreen with Oliver Hardy, en route to the team's official debut on October 8, 1927, in The Second Hundred Years.

Reception
Despite some positive reviews in the trades, the film failed to generate much interest and Healy's fledgling film career was put on hold for another four years. Likewise, the film did little to alter the downward trajectory of its curiously uncredited leading lady, Helene Chadwick.

References

External links 

1926 films
1926 comedy films
American silent short films
American black-and-white films
Films directed by Stan Laurel
1926 short films
American comedy short films
1920s American films